Bruchia is a genus of beetles in the tribe Chalepini.

Species 
 Bruchia armata Staines, 2007 - Brazil, Colombia and Peru
 Bruchia fulvipes (Baly, 1885)
 Bruchia scapularis Staines, 2007 - Colombia
 Bruchia sparsa Weise, 1906

References 

Cassidinae
Chrysomelidae genera